Frederick Goodall  (17 September 1822 – 29 July 1904) was a British artist.

Life
Frederick Goodall was born  in London in 1822, the second son of steel line engraver Edward Goodall (1795–1870). He received his education at the Wellington Road Academy.

Goodall's first commission, for Isambard Brunel, was six watercolour paintings of the Thames Tunnel. Four of these were exhibited at the Royal Academy when Frederick was 16. His first oil won a Society of Arts silver medal. He exhibited work at the Royal Academy 27 times between 1838 and 1859. He was elected an Associate of the Royal Academy (ARA) in 1852 and a full Royal Academician (RA) in 1863.

Goodall visited Egypt twice; in 1858 and again in 1870, both times travelling and camping with Bedouin tribesmen.  On his first visit to Egypt, he shared a house and studio with artist, Carl Haag and the pair often sketched together, both in the streets and outside Cairo, especially in the area around the Pyramids. On his second visit in 1870, he lived at Saqqara, near the Pyramids with the aim of directly observing Bedouin lifestyles. After his return to England, Goodall painted many variations of the same Eastern themes. In order to provide authentic detail to his paintings, Goodall brought back sheep and goats from Egypt. The Egyptian theme was prominent in his work, with 170 paintings being exhibited at the Royal Academy over 46 years.

Goodall's work received high praise and acclaim from critics and artists alike and he earned a fortune from his paintings.

He had a home built, Grims Dyke, Harrow Weald, (1870-2), designed by Norman Shaw, where he would entertain guests such as the Prince of Wales (later Edward VII).

Family
Goodall married Anne Thomson (26 Dec 1822 - 11 Aug 1869), daughter of the engraver James Thomson, in 1846. Among their five children were artists Frederick Trevelyan and Howard Goodall. Frederick Trevelyan was the more successful in a very short career, dying following a pistol accident at the age of 24. Following the death of Anne, who is buried in Highgate Cemetery in 1869, Goodall married artist Alice May Tarry in 1872. they had two children.

Frederick Goodall's brother, Edward Angelo Goodall (1819–1908) was also a highly gifted artist who exhibited at the RA from 1846 to 1853. A specialist in watercolours, he was invited to join the Royal Watercolour Society in 1856 and exhibited 328 pictures at its exhibitions. It was Edward who had the distressing task of arranging the sale of his brother's pictures and effects when he was declared bankrupt in 1902. His other brother Walter Goodall, and sister Eliza Goodall, were also artists.

Death
Although hugely wealthy at the height of his career, his income dwindled during his final years and when he died in 1904 he was bankrupt.  He was buried in a family vault (no.16876) on the western side of Highgate Cemetery.

Gallery

Notes

References

Frederick Goodall, The Reminiscences of Frederick Goodall R.A.. London and Newcastle upon Tyne: Walter Scott Publishing Co. Ltd, 1902.
N. G. Slarke, Frederick Goodall, R.A.. Oundle, 1981
John Ramm, 'Artist Adventurer', 'Antique Dealer & Collectors Guide, December 1997, Vol51, No. 5

External links

 

1822 births
1904 deaths
Burials at Highgate Cemetery
19th-century English painters
20th-century English painters
Artists' Rifles soldiers
English male painters
English watercolourists
Orientalist painters
Painters from London
Royal Academicians
20th-century English male artists
19th-century English male artists